Scheila Carvalho Ladeira (September 24, 1973, in Juiz de Fora) is a Brazilian model, dancer, and latterly sex symbol.  She rose to prominence as a dancer for axé act É o Tchan!, and has gone on to appear in numerous magazine photo shoots, including several for the Brazilian Playboy. She is married to Jorge Antonio da Silva Santos (also known as "Tony Salles") from É o Tchan!. She left the band with Salles in 2005 and she currently hosts a TV show in Bahia. She is a Spiritist.

References

External reference

1973 births
Living people
People from Juiz de Fora
Brazilian female models
Brazilian television presenters
The Farm (TV series) contestants
Brazilian female dancers
Brazilian women television presenters
Brazilian spiritualists